Victoria Hotel or Hotel Victoria may refer to:

 Hotel Victoria (Toronto), Ontario, Canada
 Radisson Montevideo Victoria Plaza Hotel, Montevideo, Uruguay
 The Royal Victoria Hotel, Newport, Shropshire, England, UK
 Victoria Hotel, Adelaide, built by William Williams in 1840
 Victoria Hotel, Amsterdam, Netherlands
 Victoria Hotel, Darwin, Northern Territory, Australia
 Victoria Hotel (Toodyay), Western Australia

See also 
 The Empress Hotel